Aspectism is a type of visual art which only attempts to represent outward appearances.

References

Visual arts genres